Arise Roots is an American roots reggae band based out of Los Angeles, California. Their music is described as a "positive classic roots sound with a modern twist".

History

Formation and Lay Your Guns Down EP (2010)
Arise Roots formed in 2010 on the streets of L.A. with one goal in mind: to create a new sound of "quality high grade roots reggae" with a modern feel that appeals to all walks of life without compromising traditional reggae music.

With Montoya on the drum kit, Rudy Covarrubias on bass, Todd Johnson on keys and harmonies, Arise Roots needed a soulful singer. Karim Israel was added on lead vocals  when he answered Montoya's ad on Craigslist. A month later, lead guitarist, Robert Sotelo was added to the band.

On November 16, 2010, the band self-released their first EP titled, Lay Your Guns Down.

Moving Forward (2013)
On February 19, 2013, the band released their first full-length album, Moving Forward, a 16-song LP they self-produced. The album was recorded at one of L.A.'s top studios, Kingsize Soundlabs. It was mastered by veteran recording engineers Brian Dixon and Richard Robinson.

Love & War (2014)
Their second album, Love & War was released on August 5, 2014. The album was engineered by E.N Young of Tribal Seeds at his Imperial Sound Recording Studio in San Diego, California. It features E.N. Young himself, Rootz Underground, HIRIE, Dan Kelly of Fortunate Youth and other reggae artists on some tracks.

In 2016, Arise Roots released two summer singles, "Rootsman" featuring reggae legend Capleton and the second single "Crisis" exclusively on vinyl via Angel City Records.

Pathways (2020)
Arise Roots was featured as one of many reggae bands on Collie Buddz riddim album, Cali Roots Riddim 2020 with their single, "Cali Love", which was produced by Collie Buddz and mixed by Stick Figure's touring guitarist, producer Johnny Cosmic.

On July 30, 2020, the band released their third album, Pathways on Ineffable Records. However, Ron Montoya did not return and Blake Colie was added on drums.

The 15-track studio album was recorded at 17th Street Recording Studio in Costa Mesa, California. It features Kyle McDonald of Slightly Stoopid, Eric Rachmany of Rebelution, Lutan Fuyah, Nattali Rize and Turbulence.

Arise Roots announced on their social media pages that they will release their first dub album, titled Dubways, an accompaniment to their Pathways album. The LP album is mixed by Zion I Kings and only available digitally on January 27, 2023 on Ineffable Records. The band will be releasing a new single every Friday, starting with their first single, "For Who You Are Dub".

Touring
Arise Roots has performed at California Roots Festival in Monterey, California.

They supported Tribal Seeds on their "Summer Smoke Out Tour" in 2015.

They shared the stage with artists such as: The Aggrolites, Anuheau, Barrington Levy, Dirty Heads, Don Carlos, Gramps Morgan, The Expanders, Fortunate Youth, Matisyahu, Public Enemy, Rootz Underground, Sister Carol, Tribal Seeds, The Wailers, Luciano, Midnite, Michael Rose, Gondwana, Big Youth, Dennis Al Capone, The Lions, Quinto Sol, Tristan Palmer, Sammy Dread, Ky-Mani Marley, Ken Boothe, Carlton and The Shoes, The Meditations, Freddie McGregor, and Natural Vibrations.

Other Projects
In May 2021, Arise Roots collaborated with Engine Athletics with two styles of basketball jerseys. One paying homage their hometown Los Angeles Lakers uniform. And the other, called "Conquering Lion", is a tribute to their reggae roots in a black and gold color scheme.

Discography

Studio albums

EPs/Dub Album

Singles

Lineup

Current band members
Karim Israel – Lead Vocals (2010–Present)
Todd "Rootsbubbler" Johnson – Keyboard, Backing Vocals (2010–Present)
Robert "Sloedub" Sotelo – Lead Guitar (2010–Present)
Rodolfo "Rudy" Covarrubias – Bass (2010–Present)
Chris Brennan – Rhythm Guitar, Backing Vocals (2014–Present)
Hashim "Scorpion" Russell – Drums (2022–Present)

Past band members
Ron Montoya – Drums (2010–2017)
Winston Peters – Drums (2017–2018)
Blake Colie – (2018–2021)
Angel Salgado – Rhythm Guitar, Backing Vocals (2010–2014)

Subs 

 Jamey "Zeb" Dekofsky – Drums
 Jason Beltran – Bass
 Eddie "Chiquis" Lozoya – Rhythm Guitar

Extreral links

References

Musical groups from California
Musical groups established in 2010
American reggae musical groups
Musicians from Los Angeles
Reggae rock groups
2010 establishments in California